The 2021 Polish Athletics Championships was the 97th edition of the national championship in outdoor track and field for athletes in Poland. It was held between 24 and 26 June at the Stadion Olimpii in Poznań.

Schedule

Results

Men

Women

Finals

Men

100 metres 
Source:

200 metres 
Source:

400 metres 
Source:

800 metres 
Source:

1500 metres 
Source:

5000 metres 
Source:

110 metres hurdles 
Source:

400 metres hurdles 
Source:

3000 metres steeplechase 
Source:

4 × 100 metres relay 
Source:

4 × 400 metres relay 
Source:

10,000 metres walk 
Source:

High jump 
Source:

Pole vault 
Source:

Long jump 
Source:

Triple jump 
Source:

Shot put 
Source:

Discus throw 
Source:

Hammer throw 
Source:

Javelin throw 
Source:

Women

100 metres 
Source:

200 metres 
Source:

400 metres 
Source:

800 metres 
Source:

1500 metres 
Source:

5000 metres 
Source:

100 metres hurdles 
Source:

400 metres hurdles 
Source:

3000 metres steeplechase 
Source:

4 × 100 metres relay 
Source:

4 × 400 metres relay 
Source:

5,000 metres walk 
Source:

High jump 
Source:

Pole vault 
Source:

Long jump 
Source:

Triple jump 
Source:

Shot put 
Source:

Discus throw 
Source:

Hammer throw 
Source:

Javelin throw 
Source:

References

External links 
Polish Athletics Association website 
Results 

2021
Polish Championships
Polish Athletics Championships
Sport in Poznań